Heinz is a German surname and cognate of Henry. People with this surname name include:

 André Heinz (born 1969), American  environmentalist
 Bob Heinz (born 1947), former American football  defensive tackle
 Christopher Heinz (born 1973), son of John Heinz III, stepson of the 68th United States Secretary of State and heir to the vast H. J. Heinz Company food-empire (Heinz ketchup) 
 Drue Heinz, American arts patron
 Edward J. Heinz (born 1932) American air force general
 Erhard Heinz (1924-2017), German mathematician
 George Heinz, Australian rules  footballer
 Gerard Heinz (1904–1972), German actor
 Gerd Heinz (born 1940), German stage, film and television actor, stage director and theatre manager
 Henry J. Heinz (1844–1919), Founder of H. J. Heinz Company (Heinz ketchup) 
 Jack Heinz (1908–1987), one time CEO of H. J. Heinz Company (Heinz ketchup) and father of Senator John Heinz
 John Heinz III (1938–1991), U.S. senator from Pennsylvania, heir to the vast H. J. Heinz Company food-empire (Heinz ketchup) 
 Katharina Heinz (born 1987), German  skeleton racer
 Marek Heinz (born 1977), Czech football player
 Matthew Heinz (born 1977), American doctor and politician
 Pius Heinz (born 1989), German professional poker player
 Teresa Heinz (born 1938), wife of the 68th United States Secretary of State John Kerry, widow of US senator John Heinz III, heir to the vast H. J. Heinz Company food-empire (Heinz ketchup) 
 Tim Heinz (born 1984), Luxembourg footballer
 W. C. Heinz (1915–2008), American sportswriter
 Wolfgang Heinz (actor) (1900–1984) 
 Wolfgang Heinz (criminologist) (born 1942)
 Wolfgang Heinz, a German politician (born 1938)
 Willi Heinz (born 1986), New Zealand rugby union footballer

See also 
 Heinz (given name)
 Hines (name)
 Heinz (disambiguation)
 Heine, a surname
 Heines, a surname

Surnames
German-language surnames
Surnames of German origin
Surnames from given names